The Mong Bridge (Cầu Mống in Vietnamese, "Rainbow bridge") is a steel bridge across the Bến Nghé River, connecting District 1 and District 4 of Ho Chi Minh City. It is one of the oldest bridges in that city. Originally named Pont des Messageries maritimes, it was built in 1893-1894 by the French construction company Levallois Perret (the company formerly led by Gustave Eiffel) for the merchant shipping company Messageries maritimes.  The bridge was completely removed in 2005 during the construction of the Saigon River Tunnel and afterwards rebuilt, turning it from a road bridge into a footbridge. In addition, the previous statue of An Duong Vuong holding a magic crossbow was also dismantled.

Notes

External links
 

Footbridges
Buildings and structures in Ho Chi Minh City
Steel bridges